Acatzingo de Hidalgo is a city and the seat of Acatzingo municipality located in, Puebla, Mexico, at 2 140 meters above sea level. The urban center is located between Citlaltépetl and Malinche at a distance of about 50 km from the city of Puebla de Zaragoza.

References

Populated places in Puebla